The Town of Cedaredge is a home rule municipality located in Delta County, Colorado, United States. The town population was 2,279 at the 2020 United States Census. Cedaredge sits in the Surface Creek Valley beneath the southern slopes of the Grand Mesa, the largest mesa in the world. Its elevated vantage point affords southern views of the San Juan Mountains, the Black Canyon of the Gunnison National Park, and the communities of Delta, Olathe, and Montrose. Cedaredge is a small, agricultural community which produces beef cattle, elk, apples, peaches, and wine from the region's few basic vineyards. Tourist attractions include Cedaredge Golf Club, Historic Pioneer Town, and an art gallery and craft store housed in a renovated apple packing shed. Regional sporting activities include camping, trophy hunting, hiking and Gold Medal fishing at more than 250 lakes on the Grand Mesa. During the winter locals partake in snowmobiling and Nordic skiing on the Mesa's trails.

History

Early history
Up until 1880 much of central and western Colorado was inhabited by the Ute Indians. Under the Act of June 15, 1880, the Utes ceded a large portion of their land to the United States, including the Surface Creek Valley.  On September 1, 1881, the last band of Utes made their exodus from western Colorado to the northeastern part of Utah under escort of troops from Fort Crawford.  Settlers soon began arriving, building homesteads, barns, businesses, and ranches. Much of the land was carved up into cattle ranches, fruit orchards, and fields of alfalfa, and grass, but the most successful business is cattle ranching to the west of the town.

The town of Cedaredge was officially incorporated on March 25, 1907 by a few ranchers.

McGruder Fire

Lightning struck a tree on Friday July 2, 2004. The fire smoldered overnight and hot dry winds fanned the flames into a large wildfire on July 3, 2004. By Sunday July 11, the fire was considered 100 percent contained. Thanks to the efforts of the Cedaredge volunteer and other area fire departments, San Juan Hot Shots, the BLM and Forest Service, no homes or lives were lost.

Centennial celebration
The Town of Cedaredge celebrated its centennial in 2007.

Geography
Cedaredge is located at  (38.9016487,-107.9264540).

Climate
The climate in Cedaredge, like much of the Grand Valley and Uncompahgre Valley, consists of mild, snowy winters; summers are hot and dry with scattered afternoon thunderstorms occurring often but delivering a small amount of total precipitation.

Demographics

As of the census of 2010, there were 2,253 people, 894 households, and 554 families residing in the town. The racial makeup of the town was 96.01% White, 0.50% African American, 0.38% Native American, 0.43% Asian, 0.16% Pacific Islander, 0.59% from other races, and 2.37% from two or more races. Hispanic or Latino of any race were 5.39% of the population.

There were 894 households, out of which 20.8% had children under the age of 18 living with them, 51.6% were married couples living together, 7.3% had a female householder with no husband present, and 38.0% were non-families. 34.3% of all households were made up of individuals, and 21.1% had someone living alone who was 65 years of age or older.  The average household size was 2.07 and the average family size was 2.61.

In the town, the population was spread out, with 18.8% under the age of 18, 5.5% from 18 to 24, 19.0% from 25 to 44, 25.1% from 45 to 64, and 31.6% who were 65 years of age or older.  The median age was 51 years. For every 100 females, there were 88.2 males.  For every 100 females age 18 and over, there were 85.3 males.

The median income for a household in the town was $27,381, and the median income for a family was $35,052. Males had a median income of $32,426 versus $21,500 for females. The per capita income for the town was $20,059.  About 10.0% of families and 14.9% of the population were below the poverty line, including 20.8% of those under age 18 and 10.4% of those age 65 or over. The median gross rent was $796 a month (2011), estimated rent burden was 34.6%.

Sites of interest and events

Pioneer Town
Pioneer Town is a museum and historical village. The centerpieces of Pioneer Town are the octagonal Bar-I Silos, the last remaining structures of the Bar-I Ranch, a cattle ranch that was established in the early 1880s.  You can go back in time by visiting the museum's replicas of early 20th-century town buildings, including a western saloon, marshall's office, barber shop, bank, clothing store, jail, creamery, and a working blacksmith's shop.  Pioneer Town is also the home of the Chapel of the Cross, with its summer season concerts; available for private weddings.  It is a prairie-style chapel housing one of the world's largest digital organs. Also in Pioneer Town is the Doll and Toy House, a building designed to display a portion of the museum's large collection of dolls and toys from the past, and the Sutherland Indian Museum housing one of Colorado's largest arrowhead displays.  The old Stolte Packing Shed also serves as a rental facility for local events and receptions.  Open Memorial weekend in May through the first weekend in October, with its renowned Antique and Classic Car Show as part of the town of Cedaredge's Applefest weekend celebration.

Cedaredge Golf Club
Opened in the Spring of 1988, as the Deer Creek Village Golf Club, Cedaredge Golf Club is a public golf course in Cedaredge, Colorado.  The golf course was completed in April 1992 and is located on what was part of the Bar-I Cattle Ranch hayfields of the early 1900s.  This 18 hole course has four tee boxes per hole.  Cedaredge Golf Club includes a driving range, clubhouse, and grill.

Applefest
In 1978 the "Cedaredge Harvest Festival" officially changed its name to "AppleFest."  Applefest is an annual celebration of apples, arts, music, and food held the first weekend in October in Cedaredge, Colorado.  It is attended by around 15,000 visitors each year and typically over 200 food, arts and crafts vendors.  The event features a classic car show, antique tractor show, and motorcycle show.

Musical guests feature folk, gospel, blues, country, rock, bluegrass and others with local, regional and national artists.

Applefest 2014 marked the 37th Anniversary of the event.

Grand Mesa Scenic and Historic Byway
The Grand Mesa Scenic and Historic Byway scenic and historic byway was approved by the Colorado Department of Transportation in 1991. Grand Mesa visitors center has maps, books and other information about the area. The byway sneaks past Island Lake, one of more than 300 trout-filled lakes in Grand Mesa National Forest. On the north side of the Mesa are the towns of Mesa, Collbran, and Powderhorn Ski Resort. The byway continues along De Beque Canyon, with its colorful sandstone bluffs, and eventually meets Interstate 70 in the town of De Beque.

Cedaredge Volunteer Fire Department
Cedaredge Volunteer Fire Station has held an annual "5-Alarm Chili Cook-off" fundraiser since 2000.  This yearly fundraising event kicks off the town of Cedaredge's Applefest celebration during the first week of October.

Education

Education in the early days of Surface Creek Valley consisted of several one-room school houses scattered across the rural countryside.  In 1920 the new Consolidated Cedaredge High School was constructed and regular bussing began in the area.

Cedaredge High School
Completed in 1982, the current Cedaredge High School has an enrollment of approximately 250 students.  Unusual for a school of its size, it contains a technology lab, geodesic greenhouse, and an integrated cafeteria/auditorium.  The mascot for its athletic teams is the Bruin and it competes in 1A football, and basketball, and in division 3A for volleyball, wrestling, baseball, swimming, tennis, and track. The Cedaredge High School Bruin Marching Band has won seven state marching titles in class 1A (2002, 2003, 2005, 2011, 2012, 2013, and 2014) The band set the record in 2011 for the smallest band (23 members) to win a state championship in Colorado and broke that record in 2012 with 17 members.

The (boys') football team won second place in the state championships in 1993, with the final being held at Cedaredge High School. After the team had not been to the state play-offs since 2002 and the 2008 season resulted in a win of 4 out of 10 games (no draws), the team was considered to have been "down the past several years" even by local media; the Denver Post criticized as its primary weakness the "lack of playing as a team." The school managed to hire Rich Stubler, who coached for 22 years in the Canadian Football League including being head coach for the Toronto Argonauts for 10 games in 2008, as new head coach starting in the off-season of 2009; Stubler explained his choice of working for a small town high school with needing a break. The team finished the season with Stubler with 2 wins out of 10 games (no draws).
They hired Brandon Milholland the next year (2010) and he would lead the team to a state championship in 2012.

Roger Ellison, a 17-year-old senior, disappeared from the basement of the former Cedaredge High School on February 10, 1981. He has been neither seen nor heard from since, and authorities believe he was killed by someone he knew shortly after he vanished.

Cedaredge Middle School
Cedaredge Middle School occupied the original building of the Cedaredge Consolidated High School from the early 1980s until the current home for Cedaredge Middle School was built in 2004.  It is located between the High School and Deer Creek Village golf course at the foot of Cedar Mesa.

Cedaredge Elementary School
The original school was built in 1959 and also known as Cedaredge Hunsicker Elementary School. A new school was completed on the south side of the road in 2012, and the parts of the old school on the north side of the road now serve the Surface Creek Vision Program.

Surface Creek Vision Program
Founded in 2003, the Surface Creek branch of the Delta County Vision program is a synthesis of homeschooling and public schooling philosophies.

Cedaredge Public Library
The current home for the Cedaredge Public Library was built in the 1990s.

See also

Colorado
Bibliography of Colorado
Index of Colorado-related articles
Outline of Colorado
List of counties in Colorado
List of municipalities in Colorado
List of places in Colorado

References

External links

Town of Cedaredge website
CDOT map of the Town of Cedaredge

Towns in Delta County, Colorado
Towns in Colorado